Skala-Podilska or Skala upon Zbruch is an urban-type settlement in Chortkiv Raion, Ternopil Oblast, Ukraine over the Zbruch River. It hosts the administration of Skala-Podilska settlement hromada, one of the hromadas of Ukraine. Population: 

It was, at one time, named simply "Skala", however the town compounded its name, variously, to "Skala upon Zbruch", in order to distinguish itself from another town with that same name.

History
Geographically the town is located in the western Podolia, hence the name. It is located not far where Zbruch falls into Dniester. The town is first mentioned after its fortress that was built in 1360s - 1370s. After the Kingdom of Galicia-Volhynia was torn apart between the Kingdom of Poland and the Grand Duchy of Lithuania, the city was secured by the Lithuanian family of Koriatovychi, but later in the 15th century it was passed to the Polish Crown with which it stayed except Ottoman rule between 1672 and 1699 until the First partition of Poland in the late 18th century. During Ottoman times, it was nahiya centre in Kamaniçe sanjak of Podolia Eyalet as İskala. After this partition, it became part of the Habsburg monarchy except brief Russian rule between 1809 and 1815. Because of this precarious location, it has a history of ethnic diversity and has been, during periods of war or political unrest, particularly susceptible to turmoil.

Prior to World War I, Skala-Podilska was part of the province of Galicia, on the eastern border of the Austro-Hungarian Empire.

In 1919—after World War I, the collapse of the Austro-Hungarian Empire, and the Polish-Ukrainian War—Skala upon Zbruch became part of eastern Poland. It was populated mostly by Ukrainians, Poles, and Jews. The town bordered the Soviet Union, from which it was separated only by the Zbrucz River.

Prior to World War II, Skala-Podilska was home to a significant Jewish population. Cossacks from the east frequently crossed over the river to raid the town, focusing their violence and destruction on Skala's Jewish population.

In 1939—toward the beginning of World War II—the Soviet Union invaded Skala upon Zbruch and forcibly "resettled" many of the Ukrainians, Poles, and Jews to remote areas of the Soviet Union. Due both to the forcible nature of these "resettlements" and to the severe conditions of the resettlement regions, these locales have sometimes been characterized as "being arrested and sent to the gulag" (see Gulag#During World War II").

In the summer-autumn of 1941, the territories annexed by the Soviet Union were overrun by Nazi Germany in the course of the initially successful German attack on the USSR. Most of the Jews from Skala upon Zbruch perished during the Holocaust in Borshchiv Ghetto .

After the defeat of Nazi Germany, Skala-Podilska officially became part of the Soviet Union as a result of the territorial changes of Poland after World War II. It became part of Ukraine on July 16, 1990, when Ukraine declared its independence from the Soviet Union.

Until 18 July 2020, Skala-Podilska belonged to Borshchiv Raion. The raion was abolished in July 2020 as part of the administrative reform of Ukraine, which reduced the number of raions of Ternopil Oblast to three. The area of Borshchiv Raion was merged into Chortkiv Raion.

Geography and geology 
The town is located 108 km away from the regional center and 37 km from the district center.

The name of the town reflects the features of the relief and the geological structure of the terrain.  The local ultrasound mountains with rocky screws were a serious obstacle to enemies. Unlike the surrounding area, where limestone deposits belong to a thick ridge (once a barrier reef of the ancient Sarmatian, belonging to the Neogene Period Cenozois), in the Skala itself, they are an inheritance of silo. Disassembly of the Silurian period near the Skala Podilsky castle since 1996 are protected by the state as a monument of local geology.

Monuments

Nature 
Geological monument of the nature of local significance - "Dislocation of Silurian in Scali-Podilsky".

The botanical monument of the nature of local significance - "age oaks".

Scalon Podolska borders on the Podilski Tovtry National Nature Park.

Architecture, Memorial Tables 

 Scala-Podilsky castle - defensive building, monument of national importance architecture. Preserved ruins of powder tower, defensive walls and palace. 
 Scala Podilsky Park - a monument of garden art of national importance. 
 Church of the Assumption of the Blessed Virgin Mary (built in 1882 instead of the same name of the wooden temple of 1720-1728; Marriage Mykhailo Hrushevsky and Maria-Ivanne from Voyakovsky, their local pastor. 
 Roman Catholic Church of Heaven of the Blessed Virgin Mary (1719, mold) 
 People's Home (1885), for a long time requires repair 
 Church of the Suppression of the Blessed Virgin Mary (since 2013 builds) 
 Chapel-Tomb of Goluhovsky, semi-destroyed 
 Chapel, figure of Jesus Christ (2002) 
The monuments of Khmelnitsky (1954) were built, in the brotherly grave of Warriors Cha (1957), in honor of the victory in the World War II (1988), victims of Stalinist Repressions (1996), a symbolic grave of the USS (1990).

 Memorial Crosses in honor of Ukraine's independence (1992), cancellation of the Board (Restor. 1999)
 Mykhailo Hrushevsky Monument in Central Square (2010)
 Memorial tables in honor of Mikhail Baran (1987), B. Pavlyuk, M. Scala-Starytsky (1995), on the building of Katyna NKVD (14.10.2015)
 On December 26, 2014, a solemn opening and dedication of the priests of the Memorial constructed in memory of dead heroes - participants of the revolution of dignity and fighting in the east of Ukraine - the priest of the UOC KP (Fr. Ilya Nejah), the RCC - (Fr. Volodymyr Strogush) and UGCC - (Fr. Vasyl Germanyuk).

International relations 
Skala-Podilska is twinned with

  Sędziszów

References

Additional External Resources
 Paintings of Jewish Skala before the war by Shoshana Eden
http://shoshana-eden.co.il/Eng
 Bibliography for Skala Researchers
 Tracy Abraham, To Speak for the Silenced (Dvorah Publishing Company, 2007)
 Skala Monument in Holon, Israel
 Skala on the River Zbrucz, edited by Skala Research Group and Skala Benevolent Society, 2010, translation of original Skala Yizkor Book, see  http://www.shtetlinks.jewishgen.org/SkalaPodol/SkalaYizkorBook.html

Urban-type settlements in Chortkiv Raion
Podolia Voivodeship
Kingdom of Galicia and Lodomeria
Tarnopol Voivodeship
Shtetls
Holocaust locations in Ukraine
Zbruch